"Nevzdávám" ("Ain't Giving Up") is a 2011 song by the top twelve finalists of the second season of the Czech and Slovak talent show, Česko Slovenská Superstar. Issued on April 22, 2011 by Universal Music, the composition was written by Tomáš Zubák, Václav Pokorný, Peter Graus and Marián Kachút as the main theme of the series.

The track released on the soundtrack album Česko Slovenská SuperStar: Výběr finálových hitů, it peaked at number twenty-four on the Slovak radio component chart and at number forty-two on the fellow airplay-list in Czech Republic.

Credits and personnel
 Lukáš Adamec - lead vocalist, backing vocalist
 Celeste Buckingham - lead vocalist, backing vocalist
 Simona Fecková - lead vocalist, backing vocalist
 Gabriela Gunčíková - lead vocalist, backing vocalist
 Martin Harich - lead vocalist, backing vocalist
 Alžběta Kolečkářová - lead vocalist, backing vocalist
 Martin Kurc - lead vocalist, backing vocalist
 Klaudia Pappová - lead vocalist, backing vocalist
 Matej Piňák - lead vocalist, backing vocalist
 Monika Povýšilová - lead vocalist, backing vocalist
 Michal Šeps - lead vocalist, backing vocalist
 Petr Ševčík - lead vocalist, backing vocalist
 Tomáš Zubák - writer
 Václav Pokorný - writer
 Peter Graus - writer
 Marián Kachút - writer
 TV Nova - executive producer
 Markíza - executive producer
 Universal - distributor

Track listings
 "Nevzdávám" (Album version) — 4:05

Charts

References
General

Specific

2011 singles
Pop ballads
Celeste Buckingham songs